Huddersfield Giants are an English professional rugby league club from Huddersfield, West Yorkshire, the birthplace of rugby league, who play in the Super League competition. They play their home games at the John Smiths Stadium which is shared with Huddersfield Town F.C. Huddersfield is also one of the original twenty-two rugby clubs that formed the Northern Rugby Football Union in 1895, making them one of the world's first rugby league teams. The club itself was founded in 1864, making it the oldest rugby league club in the world.

They have won seven Championships and six Challenge Cups, but did not earn another honour between 1962 and 2013 until gaining the 2013 League Leaders Shield after topping the table for the first time in 81 years. 

The club, particularly amongst older supporters, is sometimes referred to as Fartown, after the area and the ground in Fartown, Huddersfield that was the club's home venue from 1878 to 1992. The club was known as Huddersfield Barracudas from 1984 to 1988 and Huddersfield-Sheffield Giants (after a merger with the original Sheffield Eagles) for the 2000 season.

The team plays in a distinctive strip of a claret shirt with thin gold hoops, claret shorts and claret and gold hooped socks. They have rivalries with Warrington, Leeds, Bradford, Halifax and Wakefield Trinity.

History

1848–1894: Foundation and early years
The earliest record of a football match being played in the Huddersfield area is in 1848, when a team of men from Hepworth took on a team of men from Holmfirth near Whnuil Bank in Holmfirth. Hepworth won a closely fought game which "exhibited the usual amount of confusions, bloody noses, etc" and took the prize of £5 which had been jointly donated by each side.

There appears to have been no formal structure to sport in the Huddersfield area until the opening of the Apollo Gymnasium on 3 August 1850. At this time the gymnasium was the only venue in the town where young men could take part in physical activities, it offered the opportunity to participate in fencing, swimming, bowling, cricket and many other sports.

In 1864 the Apollo Gymnasium was turned into the Gymnasium Theatre. The athletes of the gymnasium responded by forming a more organised athletics association. In an advertisement headed "Huddersfield Athletic Club" they invited "gentlemen desirous of becoming members" to a public meeting at 8 o'clock on the evening of 16 November 1864 at the Queen Hotel. The meeting went ahead, a hundred names were registered and a committee was formed. Within a month a new gymnasium was in service in a basement on Back John William Street. The club's 1864 foundation (a few months before that of Hull F.C.) means that it is the oldest Rugby League club, both in terms of foundation date and continuous history; it celebrated its 150th anniversary in 2014.

On 27 January 1866, twenty members of the Huddersfield Athletic Club agreed to play a football match against twenty of the Huddersfield Rifle Corps at Rifle Field in Trinity Street. Although the result was a scoreless draw, a large crowd was attracted. In light of this, the Huddersfield Athletic Club agreed to start a football section which was to start at the beginning of December 1866. Initially the Huddersfield Athletic Club made no contribution to the support of the football club and each paying member was forced to pay a subscription of 2s/6d (half a crown/p). As the football club grew, it became a useful recruiting tool for the Huddersfield Athletic Club. In 1869 six matches were played and by 1870 three of the club's players had been selected to represent Yorkshire. By 1872 there were so many players that a second team was formed.

The growth in popularity of the club and the need for better facilities led to the Huddersfield Athletic Club approaching St John's Cricket Club with a proposal to merge the two clubs. St John's Cricket Club had been formed in 1866 at Hillhouse and had moved to Fartown ground. By 1875, when amalgamation talks began, over £800 had been spent on developing the new ground. At a meeting on 27 November 1875, at the Thornhill Arms Inn the two clubs agreed to merge to form the Huddersfield Cricket and Athletics Club. The motion was passed by 55 votes to 37.

Initially the football section stayed at Rifle Field, but alterations made in the summer of 1878 meant that rugby could begin at the start of the 1878–79 season with the visit of Manchester Rangers on 2 November. The new ground would become the club's home for 114 years and would provide the club's famous "Fartown" nickname.

After the 1890–91 season, Huddersfield along with other Yorkshire Senior clubs Batley, Bradford, Brighouse, Dewsbury, Halifax, Huddersfield, Hull, Hunslet, Leeds, Liversedge, Manningham and Wakefield decided that they wanted their own county league starting in 1891 along the lines of a similar competition that had been played in Lancashire. The clubs wanted full control of the league but the Yorkshire Rugby Football Union would not sanction the competition as it meant giving up control of rugby football to the senior clubs.

1895-1920s: Northern Union and golden years
In 1895 the club were founder members of the Northern Rugby Football Union, (later the Rugby Football League).

The club has seen many ups and downs in its long history, but for the first 60 years of rugby league it was one of the powerhouses of the game, with only Wigan as rivals in terms of trophies won.

Harold Wagstaff was only fifteen years and one hundred and seventy-five days old when he played his first match for Huddersfield, against Bramley in November 1906. At the time, he was the youngest first-team player the game had seen, he had signed on for a £5 signing-on fee.

Huddersfield beat the touring 1908–09 Kangaroos 5–3. They were impressed enough with stand-off Albert Rosenfeld to sign him up that evening along with Australian Dual Code International Pat Walsh one of the best forwards of the Kangaroos. Rosenfeld played his first game against Broughton Rangers on 11 September 1909.

The club's golden period came around the time of the First World War. The club was able to assemble a team of players from across the British Empire who swept all before them. Known as "The Team of All Talents", they were led by Harold Wagstaff and are still regarded as one of the finest football teams ever to have played. In the five years leading up to the First World War they won 13 trophies.

Two members of the team, centre Harold Wagstaff and wing Albert Rosenfeld were honoured by inclusion in the original Rugby League Hall of Fame. They were later joined by the Cumberland second row Douglas Clark. Of just seventeen players to be elected to the Hall of Fame, no fewer than three were teammates in that famous Huddersfield side. In total, Huddersfield boast five representatives in the Hall of Fame, more than any other club.

The particular fame of "The Team of All Talents" sprung from their extraordinary three quarter play. In 1911–12, Rosenfeld became the first player to score more than 50 tries in a season – a feat previously thought to be impossible. That season he scored 78. His wing partner, Stan Moorhouse scored 52. In 1912–13, Rosenfeld scored 56, and then in 1913–14 he broke his own record with 80 tries, a record which stands to this day.

On 28 February 1914, the club defeated Swinton Park by a record 119–2 (Rosenfeld contributing 7 tries) in a Challenge Cup tie at Fartown. The record would stand until 26 November 1994 when the Huddersfield club broke their own World Record by defeating Blackpool Gladiators 142–4 in a Challenge Cup tie at the McAlpine Stadium – centre Greg Austin scoring 9 tries on his way to 52 tries that season, a world record for a centre. In the 1914–15 season they became only the second team to win "all four cups" when they lifted the Championship, the Challenge Cup, the Yorkshire County Cup, and the Yorkshire League. Huddersfield's dominance prior to the First World War was such that they went unbeaten in 38 consecutive matches before the suspension of the league in 1915.

Huddersfield did not take part in the 1918–19 season. In the 1919–20 season, the first five games were won for a 43 match unbeaten run over six years which still stands as a record today. The unbeaten run consisted of 28 league matches, 8 Yorkshire Cup-ties, 5 Challenge Cup-ties and 2 League Championship play-offs. In addition, Huddersfield were drawing 8–8 in a Yorkshire Cup-tie that was abandoned because of fog and replayed.

The Yorkshire Cup and Yorkshire League trophies were already won when Huddersfield met Wigan in the Challenge Cup final which resulted in a 21–10 victory. Widnes were defeated in the Championship semi-final and Hull F.C. waited at Headingley as Huddersfield strove for a clean sweep of silverware. Huddersfield were missing five players who were touring Australasia with Great Britain and Hull won 3–2.

Albert Rosenfeld's last game for the club was on 2 April 1921, a cup-tie against Leeds.

Post-war era
In the first full season after the war, a new record transfer fee of £1,650 was set when Dewsbury bought  Bill Davies from Huddersfield.

Huddersfield won the League Championship in 1949, beating Warrington 13–12 in the final at Maine Road, Manchester in front of what was at the time a world record crowd of 75,194. This capitalised on a season which also brought home the Yorkshire League title.

The highest attendance at Fartown to watch a Huddersfield game was 32,912 against Wigan on 4 March 1950. More success followed in the 1950 season as Huddersfield retained the Yorkshire League title and reached another Championship final at Maine Road. However, on this occasion Wigan proved too strong, winning 20 points to 12. Huddersfield did, however, win the Yorkshire cup with a 16–3 victory over Castleford at Headingley.

On Saturday 17 November 1951, in an ordinary league game, Australian Lionel Cooper scored a club record ten tries, as Huddersfield defeated Keighley 48–3 at Fartown.

By the end of the 1950s, Huddersfield had won 3 Yorkshire cup finals, in 1950–51, 1952–53 and 1957–58, and the Challenge Cup final, in 1952–53. Huddersfield beat St. Helens 15 – 10 in the 1953 Challenge Cup Final at Wembley.

Wakefield Trinity beat Huddersfield 16–10 in the 1960 Yorkshire County Cup Final at Headingley, Leeds on 29 October 1960.

In the 1961–62 season Huddersfield were beaten by Wakefield Trinity in the Challenge Cup final but then the following week fortunes were reversed and Huddersfield won the Championship play off final at Odsal. This is the last major trophy the club collected.

In 1962, the league was split into East and West of the Pennines; Huddersfield and Hull Kingston Rovers met at Headingley, Leeds in the first final of the Eastern Division Championship on Saturday 10 November 1962.

Reigning Champions Huddersfield were favourites to lift the Eastern Division title, especially as Rovers were missing five first choice players with injuries. The Robins, however, set the early pace and were 10–0 up after 30 minutes. Despite a rally by Huddersfield, Rovers hung on to win 13–10.

1970–1995: Decline and revival
By the 1970s, the club had become a shadow of its former self; the old Fartown ground had fallen into disrepair and the club frequently finished in the lower reaches of the league. Local businessman, John Bailey, took a controlling interest in the stadium, the club and the pavilion. In 1984, in an attempt to revive the club, Huddersfield adopted the name 'Barracudas' and Fartown was renamed Arena 84. As the crowds continued to stay away, it became clear that Bailey could not stem the decline.

Huddersfield Rugby League Club was on the point of collapse. A new board of directors took over in 1989 and injected some much needed financial resources into the club. The 'Barracudas' and 'Arena 84' names were dropped for the 1988–89 season. Nigel Stephenson was appointed as coach and Huddersfield were helped by several clubs, in particular Featherstone Rovers, to put a reasonable squad together. As well as beginning to improve the playing staff, the new owners also carried out a considerable amount of work on the Fartown stadium and by the end of the 1989–90 season significant progress was being made. Average crowds topped 1,500 for the first time since the 1970s.

Shortly after the 1991–92 season had begun, Alex Murphy took over as coach in 1991. Huddersfield were the first-ever champions of the newly formed third division in 1991–92. Promotion to the Second Division had been achieved, and there was pride once again in the famous claret and gold jersey. The expense of this achievement cost the club dearly and a new financial crisis arrived. However, along came a bright new consortium who began to shape the future of the club once again. The club left Fartown and moved to Huddersfield Town's home ground at Leeds Road in 1992.

In 1993 six teams were invited to take part in an inaugural European Clubs Championship, the six teams consisted of two from the USSR; Tiraspol and Moscow Magicians, two from France; AS Carcassonne and XIII Catalan and Batley and Huddersfield. Only weeks before departure the plans collapsed as both Soviet clubs pulled out due to financial difficulties, closely followed by Batley, Carcassonne who had just five players available due to a players’ strike. This left just Huddersfield and XIII Catalan to meet in the "final" in Barcelona. The lead changed hands three times before Huddersfield held on for a 23–22 victory.

Huddersfield were promoted as 3rd Division Champions in April 1993 but the receiver was called in, in May 1994. Huddersfield took a share in the new McAlpine Stadium (now known as John Smith's Stadium) in 1994. In March 1994, Huddersfield went into administration and the receivers sacked Murphy as coach.

In November 1994, Huddersfield set world records for score and winning margin when they beat Blackpool Gladiators 142–4, although Barrow Raiders equalled the winning margin a day later by beating Nottingham City 138–0. These records stood for almost 24 years until York City Knights beat West Wales Raiders by 144–0 in April 2018

In 1995 the first team reached the final of the Second Division premiership competition at Old Trafford.

1996–1998: Summer era and the first appearance of Giants 

In 1996, the first tier of British rugby league clubs played the inaugural Super League season and changed from a winter to a summer season. As the sport in Britain entered a new era it would be two years before Huddersfield rose again to the top level of the game. Ken Davy took over as chairman of Huddersfield and "Giants" was added to the team name.

Steve Ferres took over as coach. Garry Schofield joined Huddersfield for a six-figure sum. Ken Davy's first trophy came in 1997 at Old Trafford, where Huddersfield beat Hull 18–0 in the Divisional Championship at Old Trafford. In 1998, due to the collapse of Paris St Germain the club was promoted to Super League despite only finishing second in the second division. After helping the Giants into Super League, Schofield took over the coaching reins replacing Steve Ferres with Huddersfield saying that they needed a full-time coaching staff.

However, dark days continued, the team struggled to compete, winning only a handful of games. Garry Schofield was removed as Huddersfield Giants' coach after 13 games, having picked up two wins. Schofield was replaced by his assistant Phil Veivers as caretaker coach. Schofield later successfully sued the club for unfair dismissal. It took Huddersfield's next three coaches more than 13 games to register two wins, with the club so far off the pace in their early Super League years.

1999–2000: Huddersfield-Sheffield Giants

Mal Reilly then took over with Veivers back as assistant coach. Huddersfield finished bottom of Super League and Reilly was sacked at the end of the season. In late 1999, the club merged with Sheffield Eagles almost purely for financial reasons. Sheffield coach John Kear took over as head coach of the merged side. They were officially known as the Huddersfield-Sheffield Giants, but more popularly as 'Shuddersfield'. The Association of Premiership Clubs blocked proposals for a separate Huddersfield team in the Northern Ford Premiership. They played two home games in Sheffield at Bramall Lane with the others in Huddersfield, the away strip was in the Sheffield Eagles colours. In the 2000 season Huddersfield-Sheffield won only four games, three of them against rivals Wakefield Trinity Wildcats. This arrangement lasted only a season before the Huddersfield name was reverted to, due to rejection from both sets of fans. In the four seasons between 1998 and 2001, they lost 81 times in 99 matches, avoiding relegation for a variety of reasons.  John Kear was sacked as coach and Veivers had a second spell as interim coach.

2001–2004: Relegation
Australian Tony Smith was appointed as coach for the 2001 season after a rigorous process. This did not seem to have any effect as the club lost the first 14 matches of the season, culminating in a 78-point embarrassment by Bradford. This low point became a pivotal day for the club, however. The club won 6 and drew one of the remaining 14 games, only finishing bottom of the table after Wakefield Trinity's appeal against a 4-point salary cap deduction was successful. Widnes won the NFP competition that year and the club was seen to be fit to play in Super League. Huddersfield were finally relegated after their best season in Super League.

In 2002 Huddersfield remained a full-time professional team despite playing in the Northern Ford Premiership. The club went unbeaten for the entire league season, drawing only one match and winning a record equalling 29 games. Along the way the team accumulated 1,156 points to equal the record for points in a league season achieved in 8 more games by Leigh in 1986. The team won the Buddies Cup, as it was then known, and also the NFP Grand Final against Leigh in October 2002, which secured promotion back to the Super League for the 2003 season.

In 2003 under Smith, Huddersfield established themselves as a Super League club, finishing 10th, above Wakefield Trinity and Halifax. After guiding Huddersfield back to Super League, Smith and assistant coach Brian McDermott moved onto Headingley to take control of Leeds. St Helens assistant coach and former Hull forward Jon Sharp was appointed head coach for 2004 and the team improved again, finishing 7th in the league and making their first appearance in the Challenge Cup semi-finals since 1971.

2005–2009: Resurgence
The beginning of the 2005 Super League season saw the club make its highest-profile signing in fifty years when Australian centre Michael De Vere signed from Brisbane Broncos, becoming the club's first Australian international player since Pat Devery in the 1950s.

For the kick off of the 2006 season the club unveiled a host of new signings to strengthen the squad, including the iconic New Zealand international scrum-half Robbie Paul. After a convincing victory over Salford in the quarter final, the Giants faced Leeds (ironically coached by Tony Smith) in the Challenge Cup semi-final at Odsal, Bradford. Against all the odds, massive underdogs Huddersfield pulled out what is regarded as possibly their best performance of modern times, Stuart Donlan and Chris Nero with 2 tries apiece and Michael De Vere with a try and five goals steering them to a 30–12 victory. Huddersfield lost the 2006 Challenge Cup Final to eventual Super League champions St. Helens 42–12, but the performance heralded the best Huddersfield achievement since 1970.

The start of the 2007 season saw Huddersfield make some exciting signings, including Wests Tigers trio, Jamahl Lolesi, John Skandalis and Shane Elford, as well as Ryan Hudson. The season started horrendously for Huddersfield in terms of results. After seven consecutive losses they found themselves marooned at the foot of the table, 5 points adrift, but ironically with the second best defence in the league. Large sections of the fans began to question the coach's ability and as a result crowds began to dwindle and morale was beginning to suffer.

By the end of May, the picture was totally different. Huddersfield had a Challenge Cup quarter-final to look forward to and had been on their longest ever winning streak since joining the Super League, nine games including two wins in the Challenge Cup including a 36–12 victory over Bradford in front of the Sky Television cameras on 18 May, Huddersfield's first victory over Bradford since joining the top flight. In addition, John Sharp was named consecutively as Coach of the Month for April and May

Huddersfield's winning run came to an unexpected end in a shock 14–12 defeat by Salford at the Willows. They had been overwhelming favourites with fans and bookies. Following the 2006 Challenge Cup Final appearance, Giants continued their progress by beating Wakefield Trinity for the 9th consecutive occasion to qualify for the play-offs for the first time and a match against Hull F.C. at the KC Stadium, which was lost 22–16.

The opening 2 matches in 2008 were lost, to Leeds and to Bradford. However the 3rd match saw Sharp's team beat Castleford 64–12. After a 48–0 loss to Catalans Dragons and a run of disappointing results, Sharp's contract was terminated by Huddersfield. Following Sharp's departure from the club in 2008, Kieron Purtill had a brief spell as caretaker coach alongside Paul Anderson.

Club chairman Ken Davy brought in a new head coach, Nathan Brown, and a new set of new players for the 2009 season. New signing Brett Hodgson went on to win the Super League Man of Steel award and Huddersfield also picked up awards for Club of the Year and Coach of the Year. Huddersfield finishing 3rd in the league and managing to reach the final of the Challenge Cup where they lost 25–16 to league rivals Warrington, the team responded to their cup defeat by finishing the season in 3rd place but lost in the play-offs twice. Firstly to St. Helens away from home and then at home to Catalans Dragons.

2010–present: League leaders

After yet another promising recruitment drive from Huddersfield, they were yet again tipped to make big strides in the Super League in 2012. This season really proved as a roller-coaster ride for the "Fartown Faithful" who saw their team go from 1st in Super League to finishing 7th and yet again failing to make an impact on the play-offs. After a poor dip in form Ken Davy decided it was time for change and terminated the contracts of coach Nathan Brown and captain Kevin Brown. Paul Anderson was given the task of finishing the season as best as possible.

In 2013, Huddersfield won the League Leader's Shield, the first time they have finished top of the league in 81 years. 5 of the team were selected for the Super League Dream Team, more than any other club.

In 2014, the club celebrated the 100th anniversary of the "Team of all Talents" who won All Four Cups in 1914, by playing in heritage jerseys to commemorate the feat.

During the 2016 season, after a run of bad form, the club sacked Anderson as head coach, with Andy Kelly taking charge on an interim basis for a few games. It was later announced that the club had agreed Australian Rick Stone to be the replacement.

2017 saw an overall improvement for the Giants as they finished 8th at the end of the regular season. Despite a poor start, plagued by injury, the team saw a more successful finish after the mid-season signings of Jordan Turner and Jordan Rankin. Following the Super8s, they remained in 8th. It was announced in September that Giants' prop Sebastine Ikahihifo had achieved a place in the Super League Dream Team after a highly impressive performance that season.

Following a disappointing start to the 2018 season in which the Giants only won 2 of their opening 7 games, head coach Rick Stone was sacked. On an interim basis, former player and academy coach Chris Thorman was announced as head coach to lead the team over the Easter period. On 29 April 2018, former Canberra Raiders and St. George Illawarra Dragons player Simon Woolford was announced as the Giants new head coach. Despite being popular with the fans, Woolford left the Giants in September 2020 after being unable to agree a new contract, Luke Robinson took over as interim head coach until the end of season.

2017: Women's Side 
In December 2017, it was announced that Huddersfield would be fielding an under 19s girls side for the 2018 season, with the overall aim of producing a competitive Women's Super League team in 2019. Trials were held in January 2018.

Only 3 years after forming, the Giants Women won the Super League shield final in October 2021 by beating Featherstone Rovers 24–22 at Headingley and reached the Challenge Cup quarter final in 2022 but lost to reigning champions St Helens

Academy/Youth system 
Despite not being one of the bigger or successful clubs in Super League, the Giants have a very good academy system, backed by the Supporters Association, who provide volunteers to run and promote the games and raise vital funds, in 2018, the academy team, under head of youth Andy Kelly and head coach Luke Robinson, and nicknamed "Baby Giants" by the supporters, made it to the top 4 grand final play off semi final for the first time. They were joined by Wigan, St Helens and Leeds, however they lost 50–0 to Wigan.
Some of that team have now made the step up to first grade level and as of 2022 Jake Wardle, Oliver Russell, Innes Senior, Louis Senior, Sam Hewitt, Jon Luke Kirby, Matty English, Oliver Wilson, Ronan Michael, Dominic Young have all made the step up to first grade rugby. Other graduates from the Giants academy in the recent past include Huddersfield legends Leroy Cudjoe, Michael Lawrence and Jermaine McGillvary, also, Kruise Leeming, Jake Connor, Darnell McIntosh Sam Wood . As of 2022 there are currently 18 members of the first team squad who have graduated through Huddersfield's own youth system.

2020: New Era 
In 2020, the club announced that it had appointed Ian Watson as head coach from Salford starting in the 2021 Super League season. The club had a disappointing year in the 2021 Super League season finishing seventh on the table and missing the finals series.  However, Watson repeated his success with Salford when he steered the Giants to the Challenge cup final in May 2022, a comprehensive 25–4 win over Hull Kingston Rovers at Elland Road secured a final place against Wigan Warriors at Tottenham Hotspur Stadium
In the 2021 Super League season, the club endured a difficult campaign finishing 9th on the table.
On 28 May 2022, Huddersfield played in the 2022 Challenge Cup Final against Wigan.  Huddersfield led Wigan for nearly the entire match until Wigan scored a try with two minutes remaining to win the game 16–14 and deny Huddersfield their first major trophy win in 60 years.

Huddersfield would finish the 2022 Super League season in third place on the table.  In the elimination play off, Huddersfield suffered a shock 28–0 loss against Salford which ended their season.

Stadia

1878–1992: Fartown Ground

The Fartown Ground was originally a cricket ground before being occupied by Huddersfield rugby club in 1878. It hosted two Challenge Cup finals in 1908 and 1910 and hosted one football match. During the 1980s, the stadium fell into disrepair as Huddersfield struggled to attract crowds. Huddersfield left Fartown in 1992, but still used it as a training ground until 2004 and it still hosts amateur games.

1992–1994: Leeds Road

Huddersfield ground shared with Huddersfield Town at Leeds Road from 1992 to 1994.

1994–Present: Kirklees Stadium
In 1994 Huddersfield took a share in the then named McAlpine Stadium with Huddersfield Town after they both moved from Leeds Road. The stadium has hosted Challenge Cup semi finals on multiple occasions. The venue has a capacity of 24,500 with the Giants attendance record being 15,629 set on 10 February 2008 for match against rivals Leeds.

The clubs Academy, scholarship and Reserves side currently use the facilites at the Laund Hill complex which is home to Huddersfield YMCA Rugby Union club

Supporters
Despite not having the largest fanbase in super league they have a dedicated and loyal fanbase and a consistent following of around 100–200 dedicated away fans and average 4000+ at a majority of the home games, the fans have been nicknamed "the Cowbell Army" due to the presence of Cowbells amongst the crowd.
There is also a vibrant contingent of fans known as 'Block 7' at home games who sing, chant and creates a visual support for the team, this idea was developed in mid 2022.

The Huddersfield Giants Supporters Association (HGSA)are a voluntary group of supporters which aims to raise funds for the academy and scholarship teams, they hosts regular guest speakers evenings, fundraising events and also collect donations for a local food bank charity They also help organise and promote the club's reserves, under 18's Academy and Under 16's Scholarship games and raise valuable funds towards junior development. as well as liaising with the club on behalf of the supporters.

In 2019 the group were nominated for an award in the prestigious Huddersfield Community Awards evening for their work in junior and community development.

Kit sponsors and manufacturers

Past coaches

 Joe Withers c. 1927–28 season
 Chris Brockbank 1933–35
 Alex Fiddes 19??–??
 Russell Pepperell 19??–??
 Ernie Ashcroft 1958–61
 Dave Valentine 19??–??
 Jack Scroby 1970–??
 Ian Brooke 1979–80
 Maurice Bamford 1980–81
 Les Sheard 1981–82
 Brian Lockwood 1984
 Chris Forster 1985–86
 Jack Addy 1987
 Neil Whittaker 1988
 Nigel Stephenson 1989
 Barry Seabourne 1990–91
 Alex Murphy 1991–94
 George Fairbairn 1994–96
 Darryl Van De Velde 1996
 Steve Ferres 1997
 Garry Schofield 1998
 Phil Veivers
 Mal Reilly 1999
 John Kear 1999–2001
 Phil Veivers 2001
 Tony Smith 2001–03
 Jon Sharp 2003–08
 Kieron Purtill & Paul Anderson 2008
 Nathan Brown 2009–12
 Paul Anderson 2013–16
 Andy Kelly (interim) 2016
 Chris Thorman (interim) 2016
 Rick Stone 2016–2018
 Chris Thorman (interim) 2018
 Simon Woolford 2018–2020
 Luke Robinson (interim) 2020
 Ian Watson 2021–Present

2023 squad

2023 transfers

Gains

Losses

Players

Hall of Fame inductees
Seven Huddersfield rugby league players have been inducted into the Rugby League Hall of Fame:

Douglas "Doug/Dougie/Duggy" Clark
Neil Fox
Mick Sullivan
Albert Rosenfeld
Harold Wagstaff
Garry Schofield
Eorl Crabtree

In 2006, Rosenfeld became only the second rugby league player to be inducted into the International Jewish Sports Hall of Fame

Seasons

Men's Honours

League
Division 1/ Super League:
Winners (7): 1911–12, 1912–13, 1914–15, 1928–29, 1929–30, 1948–49, 1961–62
League Leaders:
Winners (1): 2013
Bottom 14 Championship:
Winners (1): 1964–65
Division 2/ Championship:
Winners (2): 1974–75, 2002
Division 3/ League 1:
Winners (1): 1991–92
RFL Yorkshire League:
Winners (11): 1911–12, 1912–13, 1913–14, 1914–15, 1919–20, 1921–22, 1928–29, 1929–30, 1948–49, 1949–50, 1951–52

Cup
Challenge Cup:
Winners (6): 1912–13, 1914–15, 1919–20, 1932–33, 1944–45, 1952–53
RFL Yorkshire Cup:
Winners (12): 1909–10, 1911–12, 1913–14, 1914–15, 1918–19, 1919–20, 1926–27, 1931–32, 1938–39, 1950–51. 1952–53, 1957–58
RFU Yorkshire Cup:
Winners (1): 1890
Championship Cup:
Winners (1): 2002

Women's Honours
RFL Women's Super League Shield:
Winners (1): 2021

Records (Men)

Player records
Most tries in a match: 10 by Lionel Cooper vs Keighley, 17 November 1951
Most goals in a match: 18 by Major Holland vs Swinton Park, 28 February 1914
Most points in a match: 39 by Major Holland vs Swinton Park, 28 February 1914
Most tries in a season: 80 by Albert Rosenfeld, 1913–14
Most goals in a season: 148 by Danny Brough, 2013
Most points in a season: 332 by Danny Brough, 2013

Team records
Highest score: 142–4 vs Blackpool Gladiators, 26 November 1994
Highest attendance: 32,912 vs Wigan, League, at Fartown, 4 March 1950
Highest attendance (neutral game): 35,136 Leeds vs Wakefield Trinity, RL Challenge Cup Semi-Final, at Fartown, 19 April 1947
Most consecutive wins in Super League: 8 Games (2013).
Highest attendance vs an international touring team: 26,017 vs Australia,  (1948–49 Kangaroo Tour)

All-time records
Most tries by any player in a season: 80 by Albert Rosenfeld, 1913–14
Most tries by a centre in a season: 52 by Greg Austin, 1994–95
Most tries by a centre in a game: 9 by Greg Austin, vs Blackpool Gladiators, 26 November 1994
Highest score: 142–4 vs Blackpool Gladiators, as above
Highest winning margin: 138 vs Blackpool Gladiators, as above
Longest unbeaten run: 43 matches, 1914–1919
Unbeaten in a season: 28 games (27 wins, 1 draw), 2001–02
Most points scored in a season: 1,156, 2001–2002

References

External links

 

 
1895 establishments in England
Founder members of the Northern Rugby Football Union
Rugby clubs established in 1895
Super League teams
English rugby league teams
Sports clubs in Huddersfield